In mathematics (more specifically, in homological algebra), group cohomology is a set of mathematical tools used to study groups using cohomology theory, a technique from algebraic topology. Analogous to group representations, group cohomology looks at the group actions of a group G in an associated G-module M to elucidate the properties of the group. By treating the G-module as a kind of topological space with elements of  representing n-simplices, topological properties of the space may be computed, such as the set of cohomology groups . The cohomology groups in turn provide insight into the structure of the group G and G-module M themselves. Group cohomology plays a role in the investigation of fixed points of a group action in a module or space and the quotient module or space with respect to a group action. Group cohomology is used in the fields of abstract algebra, homological algebra, algebraic topology and algebraic number theory, as well as in applications to group theory proper. As in algebraic topology, there is a dual theory called group homology. The techniques of group cohomology can also be extended to the case that instead of a G-module, G acts on a nonabelian G-group; in effect, a generalization of a module to non-Abelian coefficients.

These algebraic ideas are closely related to topological ideas. The group cohomology of a discrete group G is the singular cohomology of a suitable space having G as its fundamental group, namely the corresponding Eilenberg–MacLane space.

A great deal is known about the cohomology of groups, including interpretations of low-dimensional cohomology, functoriality, and how to change groups. The subject of group cohomology began in the 1920s, matured in the late 1940s, and continues as an area of active research today.

Motivation 
A general paradigm in group theory is that a group G should be studied via its group representations. A slight generalization of those representations are the G-modules: a G-module is an abelian group M together with a group action of G on M, with every element of G acting as an automorphism of M. We will write G multiplicatively and M additively.

Given such a G-module M, it is natural to consider the submodule of G-invariant elements:

The purpose of the first group cohomology  is to precisely measure this difference.

The group cohomology functors  in general measure the extent to which taking invariants doesn't respect exact sequences. This is expressed by a long exact sequence.

Definitions 
The collection of all G-modules is a category (the morphisms are group homomorphisms f with the property  for all g in G and x in M). Sending each module M to the group of invariants  yields a functor from the category of G-modules to the category Ab of abelian groups. This functor is left exact but not necessarily right exact. We may therefore form its right derived functors.

Cochain complexes
The definition using derived functors is conceptually very clear, but for concrete applications, the following computations, which some authors also use as a definition, are often helpful. This is an abelian group; its elements are called the (inhomogeneous) n-cochains. The coboundary homomorphisms

One may check that  so this defines a cochain complex whose cohomology can be computed. It can be shown that the above-mentioned definition of group cohomology in terms of derived functors is isomorphic to the cohomology of this complex

Here the groups of n-cocycles, and n-coboundaries, respectively, are defined as

The functors Extn and formal definition of group cohomology
Interpreting G-modules as modules over the group ring  one can note that

Therefore, as Ext functors are the derived functors of Hom, there is a natural isomorphism

Let F be a projective -resolution (e.g. a free -resolution) of the trivial -module :

e.g., one may always take the resolution of group rings,  with morphisms

Recall that for -modules N and M, HomG(N, M) is an abelian group consisting of -homomorphisms from N to M. Since  is a contravariant functor and reverses the arrows, applying  to F termwise and dropping  produces a cochain complex :

The cohomology groups  of G with coefficients in the module M are defined as the cohomology of the above cochain complex:

This construction initially leads to a coboundary operator that acts on the "homogeneous" cochains.

The coboundary operator  is now naturally defined by, for example,

The relation to the coboundary operator d that was defined in the previous section, and which acts on the "inhomogeneous" cochains , is given by reparameterizing so that

and so on. Thus

as in the preceding section.

Group homology 
Dually to the construction of group cohomology there is the following definition of group homology: given a G-module M, set DM to be the submodule generated by elements of the form g·m − m, g ∈ G, m ∈ M. Assigning to M its so-called coinvariants, the quotient

is a right exact functor. Its left derived functors are by definition the group homology

The covariant functor which assigns MG to M is isomorphic to the functor which sends M to  where  is endowed with the trivial G-action. Hence one also gets an expression for group homology in terms of the Tor functors,

Note that the superscript/subscript convention for cohomology/homology agrees with the convention for group invariants/coinvariants, while which is denoted "co-" switches:
 superscripts correspond to cohomology H* and invariants XG while
 subscripts correspond to homology H∗ and coinvariants XG := X/G.

Specifically, the homology groups Hn(G, M) can be computed as follows. Start with a projective resolution F of the trivial -module  as in the previous section. Apply the covariant functor  to F termwise to get a chain complex :

Then Hn(G, M) are the homology groups of this chain complex,  for n ≥ 0.

Group homology and cohomology can be treated uniformly for some groups, especially finite groups, in terms of complete resolutions and the Tate cohomology groups.

The group homology  of abelian groups G with values in a principal ideal domain k is closely related to the exterior algebra .

Low-dimensional cohomology groups

H 1
The first cohomology group is the quotient of the so-called crossed homomorphisms, i.e. maps (of sets) f : G → M satisfying f(ab) = f(a) + af(b) for all a, b in G, modulo the so-called principal crossed homomorphisms, i.e. maps f : G → M given by f(g) = gm−m for some fixed m ∈ M. This follows from the definition of cochains above.

If the action of G on M is trivial, then the above boils down to H1(G,M) = Hom(G, M), the group of group homomorphisms G → M, since the crossed homomorphisms are then just ordinary homomorphisms and the coboundaries (i.e. the principal crossed homomorphisms) must have image identically zero: hence there is only the zero coboundary.

On the other hand, consider the case of  where  denotes the non-trivial -structure on the additive group of integers, which sends a to -a for every ; and where we regard  as the group . Principal crossed homomorphisms must additionally satisfy  for some integer m: hence every crossed homomorphism  sending -1 to an even integer  is principal, and therefore:

with the group operation being pointwise addition: , noting that  is the identity element.

H 2
If M is a trivial G-module (i.e. the action of G on M is trivial), the second cohomology group H2(G,M) is in one-to-one correspondence with the set of central extensions of G by M (up to a natural equivalence relation). More generally, if the action of G on M is nontrivial, H2(G,M) classifies the isomorphism classes of all extensions  of G by M, in which the action of G on E (by inner automorphisms), endows (the image of) M with an isomorphic G-module structure.

An example of a second group cohomology group is the Brauer group: it is the cohomology of the absolute Galois group of a field k which acts on the invertible elements in a separable closure:

See also .

Basic examples

Group cohomology of a finite cyclic group 

Explicit cocycles 
Explicit cocycles for the group cohomology of a cyclic group using the Bar resolution can be given explicitlyprop 2.3. Note that for  non-zero even indices the cohomology groups are trivial.

Cohomology of free groups

Using a resolution 
Given a set  the associated free group  has an explicit resolution of the trivial module  which can be easily computed. The second can be found by noticing the only other mapscan be generated by the -basis of maps sending  for a fixed , and sending  for any .

Using topology 
The group cohomology of free groups  generated by  letters can be readily computed by comparing group cohomology with its interpretation in topology. Recall that for every group  there is a topological space , called the classifying space of the group, which has the propertyIn addition, it has the property that its topological cohomology is isomorphic to group cohomologygiving a way to compute some group cohomology groups. Note  could be replaced by any local system  which is determined by a mapfor some abelian group .

Group cohomology of an integral lattice 
For an integral lattice  of rank  (hence isomorphic to ), its group cohomology can be computed with relative ease.

Properties

In the following, let M be a G-module.

Long exact sequence of cohomology
In practice, one often computes the cohomology groups using the following fact: if

is a short exact sequence of G-modules, then a long exact sequence is induced:

The so-called connecting homomorphisms,

can be described in terms of inhomogeneous cochains as follows.

Functoriality
Group cohomology depends contravariantly on the group G, in the following sense: if f : H → G is a group homomorphism, then we have a naturally induced morphism Hn(G, M) → Hn(H, M) (where in the latter, M is treated as an H-module via f). This map is called the restriction map. If the index of H in G is finite, there is also a map in the opposite direction, called transfer map,

In degree 0, it is given by the map

Given a morphism of G-modules M → N, one gets a morphism of cohomology groups in the Hn(G, M) → Hn(G, N).

Products
Similarly to other cohomology theories in topology and geometry, such as singular cohomology or de Rham cohomology, group cohomology enjoys a product structure: there is a natural map called cup product:

For example, let G be the group with two elements, under the discrete topology. The real projective space  is a classifying space for G. Let  the field of two elements. Then

a polynomial k-algebra on a single generator, since this is the cellular cohomology ring of

Künneth formula

If, M = k is a field, then H*(G; k) is a graded k-algebra and the cohomology of a product of groups is related to the ones of the individual groups by a Künneth formula:

For example, if G is an elementary abelian 2-group of rank r, and  then the Künneth formula shows that the cohomology of G is a polynomial k-algebra generated by r classes in H1(G; k).,

Homology vs. cohomology
As for other cohomology theories, such as singular cohomology, group cohomology and homology are related to one another by means of a short exact sequence

where A is endowed with the trivial G-action and the term at the left is the first Ext group.

Amalgamated products
Given a group A which is the subgroup of two groups G1 and G2, the homology of the amalgamated product  (with integer coefficients) lies in a long exact sequence

The homology of  can be computed using this:

Change of group
The Hochschild–Serre spectral sequence relates the cohomology of a normal subgroup N of G and the quotient G/N to the cohomology of the group G (for (pro-)finite groups G). From it, one gets the inflation-restriction exact sequence.

Cohomology of the classifying space
Group cohomology is closely related to topological cohomology theories such as sheaf cohomology, by means of an isomorphism

In general,  can be constructed as the quotient , where  is a contractible space on which  acts freely. However,  does not usually have an easily amenable geometric description.

Further examples

Semi-direct products of groups 
There is a way to compute the semi-direct product of groups using the topology of fibrations and properties of Eilenberg-Maclane spaces. Recall that for a semi-direct product of groups  there is an associated short exact sequence of groupsUsing the associated Eilenberg-Maclane spaces there is a Serre fibrationwhich can be put through a Serre spectral sequence. Note this formalism can be applied in a purely group-theoretic manner using the Lyndon–Hochschild–Serre spectral sequence.

Cohomology of finite groups

Higher cohomology groups are torsion
The cohomology groups Hn(G, M) of finite groups G are all torsion for all n≥1. Indeed, by Maschke's theorem the category of representations of a finite group is semi-simple over any field of characteristic zero (or more generally, any field whose characteristic does not divide the order of the group), hence, viewing group cohomology as a derived functor in this abelian category, one obtains that it is zero. The other argument is that over a field of characteristic zero, the group algebra of a finite group is a direct sum of matrix algebras (possibly over division algebras which are extensions of the original field), while a matrix algebra is Morita equivalent to its base field and hence has trivial cohomology.

If the order of G is invertible in a G-module M (for example, if M is a -vector space), the transfer map can be used to show that  for  A typical application of this fact is as follows: the long exact cohomology sequence of the short exact sequence (where all three groups have a trivial G-action)

yields an isomorphism

Tate cohomology
Tate cohomology groups combine both homology and cohomology of a finite group G:

where  is induced by the norm map:

Tate cohomology enjoys similar features, such as long exact sequences, product structures. An important application is in class field theory, see class formation.

Tate cohomology of finite cyclic groups,  is 2-periodic in the sense that there are isomorphisms

A necessary and sufficient criterion for a d-periodic cohomology is that the only abelian subgroups of G are cyclic. For example, any semi-direct product  has this property for coprime integers n and m.

Applications

Algebraic K-theory and homology of linear groups
Algebraic K-theory is closely related to group cohomology: in Quillen's +-construction of K-theory, K-theory of a ring R is defined as the homotopy groups of a space  Here  is the infinite general linear group. The space  has the same homology as  i.e., the group homology of GL(R). In some cases, stability results assert that the sequence of cohomology groups

Such results have been established when R is a field or for rings of integers in a number field.

The phenomenon that group homology of a series of groups  stabilizes is referred to as homological stability. In addition to the case  just mentioned, this applies to various other groups such as symmetric groups or mapping class groups.

Projective representations and group extensions

where  is a phase.

Requiring associativity

leads to

which we recognise as the statement that  i.e. that  is a cocycle taking values in  We can ask whether we can eliminate the phases by redefining

which changes

This we recognise as shifting  by a coboundary  The distinct projective representations are therefore classified by  Note that if we allow the phases themselves to be acted on by the group (for example, time reversal would complex-conjugate the phase), then the first term in each of the coboundary operations will have a  acting on it as in the general definitions of coboundary in the previous sections. For example,

Extensions

Cohomology of topological groups
Given a topological group G, i.e., a group equipped with a topology such that product and inverse are continuous maps, it is natural to consider continuous G-modules, i.e., requiring that the action

is a continuous map. A special case occurring in algebra and number theory is when G is profinite, for example the absolute Galois group of a field. The resulting cohomology is called Galois cohomology.

Non-abelian group cohomology

Using the G-invariants and the 1-cochains, one can construct the zeroth and first group cohomology for a group G with coefficients in a non-abelian group. Specifically, a G-group is a (not necessarily abelian) group A together with an action by G.

The zeroth cohomology of G with coefficients in A is defined to be the subgroup

of elements of A fixed by G.

The first cohomology of G with coefficients in A is defined as 1-cocycles modulo an equivalence relation instead of by 1-coboundaries. The condition for a map  to be a 1-cocycle is that  and  if there is an a in A such that . In general,  is not a group when A is non-abelian. It instead has the structure of a pointed set – exactly the same situation arises in the 0th homotopy group,  which for a general topological space is not a group but a pointed set. Note that a group is in particular a pointed set, with the identity element as distinguished point.

Using explicit calculations, one still obtains a truncated long exact sequence in cohomology. Specifically, let

be a short exact sequence of G-groups, then there is an exact sequence of pointed sets

History and relation to other fields 

The low-dimensional cohomology of a group was classically studied in other guises, well before the notion of group cohomology was formulated in 1943–45. The first theorem of the subject can be identified as Hilbert's Theorem 90 in 1897; this was recast into Emmy Noether's equations in Galois theory (an appearance of cocycles for ). The idea of factor sets for the extension problem for groups (connected with  ) arose in the work of Otto Hölder (1893), in Issai Schur's 1904 study of projective representations, in Otto Schreier's 1926 treatment, and in Richard Brauer's 1928 study of simple algebras and the Brauer group.

In 1941, while studying  (which plays a special role in groups), Heinz Hopf discovered what is now called Hopf's integral homology formula , which is identical to Schur's formula for the Schur multiplier of a finite, finitely presented group:

where  and F is a free group.

Hopf's result led to the independent discovery of group cohomology by several groups in 1943-45: Samuel Eilenberg and Saunders Mac Lane in the United States ; Hopf and Beno Eckmann in Switzerland; Hans Freudenthal in the Netherlands ; and Dmitry Faddeev in the Soviet Union. The situation was chaotic because communication between these countries was difficult during World War II.

From a topological point of view, the homology and cohomology of G was first defined as the homology and cohomology of a model for the topological classifying space BG as discussed above. In practice, this meant using topology to produce the chain complexes used in formal algebraic definitions. From a module-theoretic point of view this was integrated into the Cartan–Eilenberg theory of homological algebra in the early 1950s.

The application in algebraic number theory to class field theory provided theorems valid for general Galois extensions (not just abelian extensions). The cohomological part of class field theory was axiomatized as the theory of class formations. In turn, this led to the notion of Galois cohomology and étale cohomology (which builds on it) . Some refinements in the theory post-1960 have been made, such as continuous cocycles and John Tate's redefinition, but the basic outlines remain the same. This is a large field, and now basic in the theories of algebraic groups.

The analogous theory for Lie algebras, called Lie algebra cohomology, was first developed in the late 1940s, by Claude Chevalley and Eilenberg, and Jean-Louis Koszul . It is formally similar, using the corresponding definition of invariant for the action of a Lie algebra. It is much applied in representation theory, and is closely connected with the BRST quantization of theoretical physics.

Group cohomology theory also has a direct application in condensed matter physics. Just like group theory being the mathematical foundation of spontaneous symmetry breaking phases, group cohomology theory is the mathematical foundation of a class of quantum states of matter—short-range entangled states with symmetry. Short-range entangled states with symmetry are also known as symmetry-protected topological states.

See also 

 Lyndon–Hochschild–Serre spectral sequence
 N-group (category theory)
 Postnikov tower

Notes

References

Works cited

Further reading 
 
 
 Chapter 6 of 

Algebraic number theory
Cohomology theories
Group theory
Homological algebra